Demonic Toys is a 1992 American direct-to-video horror comedy film produced by Charles Band's Full Moon Entertainment and directed by Peter Manoogian. The film centers on a police officer who is terrorized by the title characters after a botched arrest. Like many other Full Moon releases, Demonic Toys never had a theatrical release and went straight-to-video in 1992. In the United States, the film was given an "R" rating for violence, language, and brief nudity. The franchise was created by Charles Band.

A sequel, Dollman vs. Demonic Toys, was released in 1993. It was followed by a second sequel in 2004, Puppet Master vs Demonic Toys, and a third sequel, Demonic Toys: Personal Demons in 2010. A fourth sequel/spin-off titled Baby Oopsie was released in 2021. The film received generally negative reviews from critics.

Plot
Judith Gray and Matt Cable—two police officers who are dating—wait at the Toyland Warehouse to arrest illegal gun dealers Lincoln and Hesse. Judith tells Matt about a strange dream she has been having: two boys—one good, one bad—playing war. She also reveals that she is pregnant. The confrontation with the gun dealers ends with Matt shooting Hesse, and Lincoln killing Matt. Lincoln and Hesse hide inside the Toyland Warehouse and split up; Judith goes after Lincoln.

In the security office, security guard, Charneski places an order at a chicken delivery service run by his friend Mark Wayne. Mark arrives at the warehouse with Charneski's order. Meanwhile, the toys that surround a dying Hesse come to life and brutally murder him. Judith and Lincoln become locked inside the storage closet but are freed by Mark and Charneski. Charneski goes to call the police, but is also graphically murdered by the toys, with Mark and Judith watching in horror. A toy named Baby Oopsy Daisy draws a pentagram around Charneski's corpse.

A runaway named Anne who had been hiding in the air-conditioner shafts, joins the group. Mark explains that the doors do not open until morning but can be opened up from the office. Judith cannot leave Lincoln as she has to bring him in, so Mark and Anne head to the office together. They are attacked by Mr. Static and Baby Oopsy Daisy. Mark fights back, but Baby Oopsy Daisy kills Anne. Mark finally shoots Jack Attack's head off with Charneski's shotgun. Judith enters a dollhouse and is transported to the lair of a kid who reveals that he is a spirit of a demon who wants to become human. In order to do that, he has to impregnate a woman so that his soul can transfer into the woman's egg, where he has to eat the baby's soul and take over its shell. If the baby does not survive the birth, he has to be buried like a seed, and once grown, he will start the process over again. The last time he was born was 66 years prior, on Halloween night, 1925. The baby did not survive the birth so he was buried underneath the warehouse, unable to get out until Hesse bled onto the area.

Lincoln escapes while Judith is in the dollhouse. He catches up to Mark and is about to kill him when Judith appears and shoots Lincoln. Suddenly, all of the toys around them come to life. The pair begin shooting them to death, including Baby Oopsy Daisy. Grizzly Teddy turns into a man-sized monster and chases after Judith. Judith becomes trapped and is about to shoot herself when a toy soldier helps her escape. However, Judith is caught by the demon who ties her up on the pentagram. Mark is attacked by Grizzly Teddy, but manages to kill the monster. The demon, now in the form of a man, is about to rape Judith, but the toy soldier shoots it, cuts Judith free, and turns into a real boy. The demon transforms back into his own kid form and the two kids begin fighting, explaining the war card game from Judith's dream. As the demon is about to kill the boy soldier, Judith stabs him with the boy soldier's sword and the demon is sent back to Hell. Before heading back to Heaven, the boy soldier reveals that he's the spirit of the son she's going to have. Judith reunites with Mark and the two wait for the doors of the warehouse to open and let them go.

Cast

 Tracy Scoggins as Judith Gray
 Bentley Mitchum as Mark Wayne
 Daniel Cerny as "The Kid"
 Michael Russo as Lincoln
 Barry Lynch as Hesse
 Ellen Dunning as Anne
 Pete Schrum as Charneski
 Jeff Weston as Matt Cable
 William Thorne as Fair-Haired Boy
 Richard Speight Jr. as Andy
 Larry Cedar as Peterson
 Jim Mercer as Dr. Michaels
 Pat Crawford Brown as Mrs. Michaels
 Christopher Robin as Skeleton Kid
 Kristine Rose as Miss July
 Robert Stockele as Man-Devil
 Crystal Carlson as Little Girl
 June C. Ellis as Old Woman

Additional voices
 Linda O. Cook as Baby Oopsy Daisy
 Edwin Cook as Grizzly Teddy
 Tim Dornberg as Jack Attack
 Brigitte Lynn as Mr. Static

Reception

Critical reception for Demonic Toys has been mostly negative. TV Guide awarded the film one out of a possible four stars. The reviewer criticized the film for its  hackneyed story and unimaginative creatures, calling it "a rehash of the company's PUPPETMASTER series". VideoHound's Golden Movie Retriever gave the film a score of one-and-a-half out of a possible four, calling it "Skimpily scripted". J.R. McNamara of Digital Retribution panned the film, criticizing the film's weak script, and poor acting.

Conversely, Felix Vasquez Jr. of Cinema Crazed.com gave the film a positive review, writing: "Demonic Toys is a schlocky and campy bit of terror fare and one that I fondly enjoyed as a first time experience. Plus, you have to appreciate the commitment of Daniel Cerny as the evil kid of the piece who is never above terrorizing and taunting his victims like a Mini-Krueger before sending his toys at his human hosts."

See also

 Killer toy

References

External links
 
 
 

1992 horror films
1992 direct-to-video films
Films about sentient toys
American supernatural horror films
Demonic Toys films
Puppet films
Films with screenplays by David S. Goyer
Films scored by Richard Band
1992 films
Films about dolls
Films directed by Peter Manoogian
Sentient toys in fiction
1990s English-language films
1990s American films